Capel George Pett Pownall (1869 – 8 February 1933) was a British archer.  He competed at the 1908 Summer Olympics in London. Pownall entered the men's double York round event in 1908, taking 11th place with 532 points. He was born in Pimlico.

References

External links
 
 

1869 births
1933 deaths
British male archers
Olympic archers of Great Britain
Archers at the 1908 Summer Olympics
20th-century British people